The León Bible of 920 is a manuscript bible copied and illuminated in 920 in a monastery in the Province of León in Spain. It is also known as the John and Vimara Bible or the Holy Bible of León. It is now held as codex 6 in the library of León Cathedral and is one of the most important manuscripts of the Spanish High Middle Ages.

It was edited by abbot Maurus and produced by the copyist and illuminator 'Ioannes' (John) under the supervision of a monk called Vimara.

References

Bibliography 
John Williams, Imaging the Early Medieval Bible, Penn State Press, 1999, 227 p. (pp. 181-183

Further reading
 Gloria Fernández Somoza, "La Biblia de León del año 920 en el contexto de la miniatura hispánica ", in: Joaquín Yarza Luaces, María Victoria Herráez Ortega, Gerardo Boto Varela, Congreso Internacional «La Catedral de León en la Edad Media», 2004, pp. 499—507
 Ana Suárez González, "La Biblia Visigótica de la Catedral de León (Códice 6) primeros apuntes para un estudio arqueológico", in: Estudios humanísticos. Historia; no. 10, 2011, pp. 179—196 (ISSN 1696-0300)

External links

10th-century illuminated manuscripts
920
10th century in the Kingdom of León